Jack Bentley (17 February 1942 – 26 May 2007) was an English professional footballer.

After early spells with Everton and Stockport Bentley moved to non-league side Telford United. In a 14 year stay Bentley scored 431 goals in 835 appearances.

External links
 

1942 births
2007 deaths
English footballers
Everton F.C. players
Stockport County F.C. players
Telford United F.C. players
Footballers from Liverpool
English Football League players
Association football forwards